Ricardo Duarte Mungi (born February 9, 1940) is a Peruvian former professional basketball player. Standing at 2.03 m (6' 8") tall, Duarte played at the center position. He was named one of FIBA's 50 Greatest Players, in 1991.

Professional career
During his club playing career, which spanned 25 years, from 1957 to 1982, Duarte played with Club Universitario de Deportes, Club de Regatas Lima, Club Deportivo Field, and Club Aviación.

National team career
Duarte was a member of the senior Peruvian national basketball team, from 1957 to 1977. With Peru, he played at the 1963 FIBA World Championship, where he was the tournament's top scorer, the unofficial 1966 Extraordinary World Championship, and the 1967 FIBA World Championship. He also played at the 1964 Summer Olympic Games, which he also led in scoring.

In addition, he played at the 1963 Pan American Games, the 1967 Pan American Games, and the 1971 Pan American Games. He also played at the following editions of the FIBA South American Championship: 1958, 1961, 1963 (silver medal), 1966 (bronze medal), 1968 (bronze medal), 1971, and 1977. He also competed at the 1961 Bolivarian Games, and the 1965 Bolivarian Games.

Personal life
Duarte's brothers, Enrique, Luis, and Raúl, were also professional basketball players. All four of them were during the 1964 Olympics.

References

External links
 

1940 births
Living people
Basketball players at the 1964 Summer Olympics
Centers (basketball)
Olympic basketball players of Peru
Peruvian men's basketball players
1963 FIBA World Championship players
1967 FIBA World Championship players
20th-century Peruvian people